Nisshinkan(日新館) is Aizu's old school.

History 
It was planned by Harunaka Tanaka in 1798. It was completed in 1803. In 1868, a schoolhouse is burned away by the Boshin War.

See also 

 Byakkotai
 Iimori Hill
 Aizu-Wakamatsu

External links 

 Official Website(in Japanese)

Culture in Fukushima Prefecture
People of the Boshin War